The Afrin River ( Nahr ʻIfrīn;  ; northern Syrian vernacular: Nahər ʻAfrīn) is a tributary of the Orontes River in Turkey and Syria.   It rises in the Kartal Mountains in Gaziantep Province, Turkey, flows south through the city of Afrin in Syria, then reenters Turkey.  It joins the Karasu at the site of the former Lake Amik, and its waters flow to the Orontes by a canal.  

About  of the annual flow of the river comes from the Hatay Province of Turkey, while about  originates in Syria.
The river is impounded by the Afrin Dam to the north of the city of Afrin.

The Afrin was known as Apre to the Assyrians, Oinoparas in the Seleucid era, and as Ufrenus in the Roman era. Abu'l-Fida mentions it as Nahr Ifrîn.

External links

References 

Rivers of Turkey
Rivers of Syria
Aleppo Governorate
Landforms of Gaziantep Province
Orontes basin